Paul Luther Snyder (born June 11, 1935) is a retired American front-office executive in Major League Baseball.

In recognition of Snyder's career accomplishments, Baseball America named him one of the top 25 people in the game on the publication's 25th anniversary in 2006.

Life and career
Snyder was born in Dallastown, Pennsylvania. He spent his entire 50-year professional baseball career in the Braves' organization, signing with them as an outfielder and first baseman in 1958 when the team was still based in Milwaukee.  As a player, Snyder never reached the Major Leagues, peaking at the Triple-A level in 1963 with the Denver Bears of the Pacific Coast League — a season which also saw his debut as a minor league manager in the Braves' farm system. Snyder, however, was a strong hitter in his playing days, compiling a lifetime batting average of .318 during his seven-year active career. In his finest over-all campaign, 1962 with the Austin Senators of the Double-A Texas League, Snyder hit .312 with 19 home runs and 113 RBI in 132 games played. He batted left-handed and threw right-handed, stood 6'2" (1.9 m) tall and weighed 200 pounds (91 kg).

Snyder managed Braves' farm clubs and scouted for them between 1963 and 1972. In 1973, he joined the team's front office as assistant minor league administrator before taking the reins of the Braves' farm department in 1977. Working with then-general managers Bill Lucas and John Mullen, Snyder was a major architect of the Braves' strong early 1980s teams under manager Joe Torre—despite having suffered a stroke at age 40 that required brain surgery and an extensive period of rehabilitation.

When the MLB Braves went through a prolonged rebuilding process after winning the  National League West Division championship, Snyder, by now scouting director, assisted general manager Bobby Cox in drafting and developing the talent base—players such as Tom Glavine, Steve Avery, David Justice, Jeff Blauser and Chipper Jones—that served as the foundation for the Braves' string of first-place teams of the 1990s through , including the 1995 world champions. He also served as top assistant to John Schuerholz when he took over the Atlanta front office after the  season and performed a number of key functions in the Braves' baseball operations department in addition to working as scouting or player development director.

Snyder retired from the Braves after the  season, which saw Schuerholz move upstairs to the team presidency and a new general manager, Frank Wren, assume control of baseball operations. In 2005, he was inducted into the Braves Museum and Hall of Fame. In 2006, he was presented with the King of Baseball award given by Minor League Baseball. In 2013, he was selected for the Professional Baseball Scouts Hall of Fame.

References

External links

 Baseball America Executive Database

1935 births
Living people
Atlanta Braves executives
Atlanta Braves scouts
Austin Senators players
Baseball players from Pennsylvania
Binghamton Triplets managers
Binghamton Triplets players
Cedar Rapids Braves players
Denver Bears players
Eau Claire Braves players
Greenville Braves players
Major League Baseball executives
Major League Baseball farm directors
Major League Baseball scouting directors
Midland Braves players
Milwaukee Braves scouts
Minor league baseball managers
People from Dallastown, Pennsylvania
Wellsville Braves players